Laura Turner is an American singer born in Houston, Texas. She came to public notice following the release of her album Soul Deep on Curb Records in 2003.

Career 
Soul Deep appeared on the Upfront Club Top 40 in 2003, reaching a peak of 4 the week of August 30, 2003.

In 2010, Laura released two Christmas songs, "Mary, Sweet Mary" and "Come As You Are", produced by Keith Thomas.

Artistry 
Turner's vocal range is soprano. Turner trained as an opera singer. Her musical style has been described as unique and similar to that of Sarah Brightman, combining classical and pop elements.

Discography 
Soul Deep (2003)

References

External links 
 Laura Turner's artists page on Curb Records

Living people
Musicians from Houston
Year of birth missing (living people)
21st-century American women singers
21st-century American singers
Singers from Texas